Seppo is a masculine given name of Finnish origin. It has two distinct origins; Seppo is a character in the Kalevala, whose name is derived from the Finnish word seppä, meaning smith, and the name is also a diminutive for Sebastian in Finland.

It may refer to:

People
Seppo Evwaraye (born 1982), Finnish National Football League offensive guard
Seppo Kääriäinen (born 1948), Finnish politician
Seppo Kolehmainen (1933–2009), Finnish film actor
Seppo Lehto (born 1962), Finnish political activist
Seppo Pääkkönen (born 1957), Finnish actor
Seppo Ruohonen (1946-2020), Finnish opera singer
Seppo Räty (born 1962), Finnish javelin thrower
Seppo Sairanen (born 1952), Finnish football manager and former goalkeeper
Seppo Seluska, Swedish neo-Nazi and subject of the historical photo A Woman Hitting a Neo-Nazi With Her Handbag
Seppo Simola (1936–2003), Finnish shotputter
Seppo Telenius (born 1954), Finnish writer
Seppo Harjanne (born 1948), Finnish WRC co-driver
Seppō Gison, the Japanese surname of Chinese Zen Master Xuefeng Yicun (822-908)

Fictional or mythological characters
 Seppo Ilmarinen, the smith in the Kalevala of Finnish mythology
 Seppo Taalasmaa, in the Finnish soap opera Salatut elämät

Other
 An Australian English variation on "septic" (from "septic tank", rhyming with "yank"), a slang term for "American" in rhyming slang

See also

 Sepo County, a county in North Korea
 Sepo, Illinois, a town in the United States

Finnish masculine given names